Francis Phillip "Frank" O’Grady  (9 October 19006 May 1981) was a senior Australia public servant. He was Director-General of the Postmaster-General's Department from September 1961 until December 1965.

Life and career
Frank O'Grady was born on 9 October 1900 in Thebarton, Adelaide the first child of Hannah and John Michael O'Grady.

He was appointed Director-General of Posts and Telegraphs, heading the Postmaster-General's Department, in September 1961.

O'Grady retired from the Commonwealth Public Service and his position at the Postmaster-General's Department in December 1965.

Awards
In 1964 O'Grady was appointed a Commander of the Order of the British Empire. He was appointed a knight commander of the papal Order of St Gregory the Great in 1969.

References

1900 births
1981 deaths
Australian public servants
Australian Commanders of the Order of the British Empire